The  is an event at the annual festival held in Naha, Okinawa, Japan. Its roots may be traced back to the 17th century. Held on Route 58, it is a battle between the East and West teams.

The event draws some 275,000 attendees annually, and is preceded on the prior day with a parade celebration on Kokusai Street (also in Naha). In 1997 the event was first logged in the Guinness Book of World Records as being the largest tug-of-war event in the world.  The rope weighs about 40 metric tons.

The event was discontinued in 1935, and disrupted by the Battle of Okinawa, but was revived in its traditional form in 1971 to celebrate the recovery from the war and to commemorate the 50th anniversary of the organization of Naha.

The festival begins with men dressed in traditional Okinawan dress standing on the rope facing in opposite directions to symbolize the battle between East and West. A myriad of performances take place along the rope's length, from martial artists of varying ages, to older women performing a sort of fan-dance. It is an international event with Japanese nationals, American military, and tourists in attendance. Just before the start of the match a man dressed in the  dress of the Ryūkyūan kings stands on a wooden platform hoisted in the air on the shoulders of men standing on opposite sides of the rope. The "king" is carried on this platform down the length of the rope, before the festival starts, and the two kings perform a ritual sword contest.

The contest lasts 30 minutes and the challenge is to pull the other team a total of 5 meters. If neither side pulls the other the 5 meters, whichever side has pulled the other the furthest wins.

After the 30-minute time limit expires, one side is declared the victors, and they are allowed to climb on top of their rope to celebrate. It is customary for participants to cut apart the rope, and take a length of it as a token, and so throngs of people using tools ranging from their pocket knives, scissors and hacksaws set on the rope, cutting lengths of it to commemorate the festival.

Further reading
The article 那覇まつり (Naha matsuri) in the Japanese Wikipedia has a section on the tug of war.
Japan Update has an article about fabricating the rope at http://www.japanupdate.com/?id=11489
Naha’s biggest festival, extending over three full days
Naha Otsunahiki Giant Tug-of-War

References

External links 

 Naha Giant Tug-Of-War Display - History and Pictures 

Festivals in Japan
Festivals in Okinawa Prefecture